Maria Teresa de Almeida Salgueiro OIH is a Portuguese singer. She is best known as the lead singer of Madredeus from 1987 until 2007. She also appeared in Wim Wenders' film Lisbon Story.

Career 
Salgueiro joined Madredeus after other members noticed her singing at a bar in Lisbon. She left Madredeus in November 2007 to focus on solo work.

In 2007, Salgueiro performed a concert of Neapolitan music at the Teatro di San Carlo with the Solis String Quartet. In the same year, she released Você e Eu with Septeto de João Cristal; in this album, Salgueiro covers songs from well-known Brazilian artists such as Chico Buarque and Vinicius de Moraes.

In 2021, Salgueiro featured in two songs of Patrick Watson's singles album.

Discography

With Madredeus 

 Os Dias da MadreDeus (1987)
 Existir (1990)
 O Espírito da Paz (1994)
 Ainda: Original Motion Picture Soundtrack From The Film «Lisbon Story» (1995)
 O Paraíso (1997)
 Movimento (2001)
 Um Amor Infinito (2004)
 Faluas do Tejo (2005)

Solo 
Obrigado (2005)
Você e Eu (2007; with Septeto de João Cristal)
La Serena (2007; with Lusitânia Ensemble)
Silence, Night & Dreams (2007, with Zbigniew Preisner)
Matriz (2009; with Lusitânia Ensemble)
O Mistério (2012)
La Golondrina y el Horizonte (2015)
O Horizonte (2016)

References

External links
  
 

Living people
20th-century Portuguese women singers
Portuguese fado singers
Singers from Lisbon
Officers of the Order of Prince Henry
21st-century Portuguese women singers
Year of birth missing (living people)